WTAN (1340 AM) is a radio station broadcasting a mixed talk radio / adult standards format. Licensed to Clearwater, Florida, United States, the station is currently owned by Wagenvoord Advertising Group Inc.

WTAN relies heavily on brokered programming for its daily lineup. The Music of Your Life format airs when brokered programs are not airing.

WTAN is the flagship of the Tan Talk Radio Network, whose programming can also be heard on WDCF AM 1350 in Dade City, Florida, and WZHR AM 1400 in Zephyrhills, Florida.

External links
FCC History Cards for WTAN
 
History at RadioYears.com

TAN
Radio stations established in 1948
1948 establishments in Florida